Wilhelm von Wright (5 April 1810 – 2 July 1887) was a Swedish-Finnish painter and amateur naturalist.

Biography
Wilhelm  von Wright was born  at the village of Haminalahti in Kuopio, Finland. His ancestors included Scottish merchants who had settled in Narva during the 17th-Century. His father Henrik Magnus von Wright was a retired Major who owned the family estate, Haminalahden. 
Two of his  brothers, Magnus von Wright (1805–1868) and Ferdinand von Wright (1822- 1906) also became painters and illustrators. 
At the invitation of Magnus, he travelled to Sweden in 1823, where he participated in producing  the multi-volume Svenska Fåglar (Stockholm:  C. von Scheele. 1828) for Swedish ornithologist  Nils Bonde.

His most important solo effort involved Skandinaviens fiskar  (Stockholm: P. A. Norstedt & Söner, 1836-1857) by Bengt Fredrik Fries and Carl Jakob Sundevall, for which he provided 60 color illustrations. He also contributed drawings to the Swedish periodicity Tidskrift för Jagare och Natur Forskaren which was published in Stockholm by the Svenska Jägareförbundet for hunters and naturalists.

In 1833, he became a member of the Stockholm Chamber of Commerce and, two years later, was elected to the Royal Swedish Academy of Arts. After 1836, he lived on the island of Orust  in the parish of Morlanda in Bohuslän where he established his residence at Marieberg. In 1845 he married  Maria Margareta Bildt (1816-1884).  In 1855, he was appointed as inspector for fisheries in Bohuslän. Not long after, he had a stroke, which left him incapacitated for the rest of his life. After his wife's death in 1884, he suffered a serious decline and died early at Orust in 1887.

See also
Von Wright
Von Wright brothers

References

Further reading 
 Anto Leikola, Juhani Lokki and Torsten Stjernberg:
Von Wright -veljesten linnut (“The Birds of the von Wright Brothers”). Otava, 2003. 
Taiteilijaveljekset von Wright: Suomen kauneimmat lintumaalaukset (“The Artist Brothers von Wright: Finland's Most Beautiful Bird Paintings”). Otava, 1986. 
 Wilhelm & Ferdinand von Wright dagböcker (journals). Svenska litteratursällskapet i Finland, 2008.

External links 

 More works by von Wright at the Kansallisgalleria.
 "Cultural Path in the Landscape of the von Wright Brothers"

1810 births
1887 deaths
Finnish illustrators
Finnish naturalists
People from Kuopio Province (Grand Duchy of Finland)
Finnish emigrants to Sweden
Finnish people of Scottish descent
Swedish-speaking Finns
Birds in art
19th-century Finnish painters
Finnish male painters
19th-century Finnish male artists